JS Sawagiri (DD-157) is an  of the Japan Maritime Self-Defense Force.

Development and design 
The Asagiri class is equipped for combat and interception missions, and is primarily armed with anti-ship weapons. They carry two of the Mk-141 Guided Missile Launching System (GMLS), which are anti-ship missile systems. The ships are also fitted to be used against submarines. They also carry Mk-32 Surface Vessel Torpedo Tubes (SVTT), which can be used as an anti-submarine weapon. The ship has two of these systems abeam to starboard and to port. They are also fitted with an Oto-Melara 62-caliber gun to be used against sea and air targets.

The ships can have up to 220 personnel on board. The ship is also fitted to accommodate one aircraft. The ship's flight deck can be used to service a SH-60J9(K) Seahawk helicopter.

Construction and career 
Sawagiri was laid down on 14 January 1987 and launched on 25 September 1988 by Mitsubishi Heavy Industries, Nagasaki. She was commissioned on 6 March 1990.

The vessel was dispatched to the Great East Japan Earthquake caused by the 2011 off the Pacific coast of Tōhoku Earthquake on 11 March 2011.

On 12 May 2012, the 12th dispatched anti-piracy action formation sailed from Sasebo off the coast of Somalia, joined by the escort ship  on the way, and started the mission about three weeks later, on 1 July. An escort formation was formed by the cooperation of the three countries of Japan, China and India. On 24 October, the same year, Sawagiri returned to Sasebo.

Sawagiri joined the 13th Escort Corps under the direct control of the Escort Fleet on 13 March 2014. On 5 July 2015, as the 22nd dispatched anti-piracy action surface corps, sailed from Sasebo base to the Gulf of Aden off the coast of Somalia with the escort ship , and completed the mission on 18 December 2015.

From 29 February to 5 March 2020, the destroyer took part in joint training with the US Navy that was conducted with the escort ship  in the sea and airspace from the south of Kantō to the north of Guam.

Gallery

References

External links 

Asagiri-class destroyers
Ships built by Mitsubishi Heavy Industries
1988 ships